Ankinatsytes is an extinct genus of cephalopod belonging to the Ammonite subclass. The ammonite is from the Late Cretaceous of Colombia (Loma Gorda Formation) and Venezuela (La Luna Formation).

Species
The following species have been described:
 Ankinatsytes venezolanus
 Ankinatsytes yabei

References

Bibliography
 

Ammonitida genera
Nostoceratidae
Late Cretaceous ammonites
Ammonites of South America
Cretaceous Colombia
Cretaceous Venezuela
Fossils of Colombia
Fossils of Venezuela
Coniacian life
Fossil taxa described in 1965